Aleksandar Simeonov may refer to:
Aleksandar Simeonov (bobsleigh) (born 1963), Bulgarian bobsledder
Aleksandar Simeonov (volleyball) (born 1986), Bulgarian volleyball player